Lithium acetate  (CH3COOLi) is a salt of lithium and acetic acid. It is often abbreviated as LiOAc.

Uses 

Lithium acetate is used in the laboratory as buffer for gel electrophoresis of DNA and RNA. It has a lower electrical conductivity and can be run at higher speeds than can gels made from TAE buffer (5-30V/cm as compared to 5-10V/cm). At a given voltage, the heat generation and thus the gel temperature is much lower than with TAE buffers, therefore the voltage can be increased to speed up electrophoresis so that a gel run takes only a fraction of the usual time. Downstream applications, such as isolation of DNA from a gel slice or Southern blot analysis, work as expected when using lithium acetate gels.

Lithium boric acid or sodium boric acid are usually preferable to lithium acetate or TAE when analyzing smaller fragments of DNA (less than 500 bp) due to the higher resolution of borate-based buffers in this size range as compared to acetate buffers.

Lithium acetate is also used to permeabilize the cell wall of yeast for use in DNA transformation. It is believed that the beneficial effect of LiOAc is caused by its chaotropic effect; denaturing DNA, RNA and proteins.

References 

 

Acetates
Lithium salts
Organolithium compounds